EIKO or Eiko may refer to:
 Eiko and Eikō, Japanese given names
 Execution of Imam Khomeini's Order (EIKO), a state-owned enterprise in Iran
 Eiko Film GmbH, a 1920s company bought by Terra Film

See also
Eiko & Koma, a Japanese performance duo